Hample is a surname. Notable people with the surname include:

Dale Hample (born 1949), American academic
Judy Hample (born 1947), American educator
Stoo Hample (1926–2010), American writer, playwright, and cartoonist
Zack Hample (born 1977), American baseball collector

See also
Hampel